Arena tram stop may refer to:

Arena tram stop (Croydon), on the Tramlink network
Arena tram stop (Sheffield), on the Yellow Line of the Sheffield Supertram network